Cobbs Hill is a mountain in Barnstable County, Massachusetts. Shootflying Hill is located west-southwest of Cobbs Hill.

References

Mountains of Massachusetts
Mountains of Barnstable County, Massachusetts